The Chester and Lenoir Narrow Gauge Railroad was a  narrow-gauge railroad that served South Carolina following the Civil War.

In 1873, the Chester and Lenoir acquired the route of the Kings Mountain Railroad, which had been started before the American Civil War but was destroyed by the Union Army and not rebuilt afterward. The line lay abandoned for several years until it was acquired by the Chester and Lenoir.

Within a decade the Chester and Lenoir had extended the line to Lenoir, North Carolina.
 
Over the next decade, the railroad operated under the umbrella of the Richmond and Danville Railroad. 
 
When the Richmond and Danville were re-organized as the Southern Railway In 1894, the Chester and Lenoir operated on its own for a short while. By 1896, it went into receivership, and the following year was re-organized as the Carolina & North-Western Railway. 

The Carolina & North-Western was absorbed into the Southern Railway around 1940.

References

Defunct South Carolina railroads
Predecessors of the Southern Railway (U.S.)
Railway companies established in 1873
Railway companies disestablished in 1897
3 ft gauge railways in the United States
American companies established in 1873
1873 establishments in South Carolina
1897 disestablishments in South Carolina